NFS may refer to:

Organisations
 NFS (news service) (Nýja fréttastofan), a defunct Icelandic television news service
 |National Film School, former name of the National Film and Television School, England
 National Financial Switch, bank network in India
 National Fire Service, the Second World War UK fire service
 National Flying Services, a defunct British aviation company
 Council of Nordic Trade Unions (Nordens Fackliga Samorganisation)
 National Forest System, created by the US Land Revision Act of 1891
 National Forest System, division of the 1905 formed United States Forest Service
 National Funding Scheme, UK charity fundraising organisation

Technology
 Network File System, a distributed file system protocol
 Near-field scanner, scanning technology
 Number field sieve, an algorithm for factoring integers

Other uses
 Need for Speed, a series of racing video games